is a manga written and illustrated by Osamu Tezuka. It was originally serialized in Weekly Shōnen King in Japan in 1970 and was published in English translation in 2007.

The story follows a neglected and abused boy, Shogo, who does not have any feelings of love. Through a series of visions spanning the past and future, Shogo explores the meaning of love between man and woman.

Plot
 is a boy whose single mother never knew his father as he was born after a series of affairs. An unintended child, his mother beat him whenever he witnesses love and tenderness. This leads to Shogo killing various animals upon seeing their love. Because of this, Shogo is taken to a mental institute. After a shock therapy, Shogo has an out-of-body experience and he meets Aphrodite, the goddess of love, who subjugates him to experience love across different time periods for the rest of eternity, dying repeatedly until he can one day understand the true meaning of love.

In his first experience, Shogo is in Nazi Germany as a German stormtrooper, where he falls in love with the Jewish Elise. Shogo helps her to escape, but she shoots him when she discovers her parents were killed. Wounded, Shogo is able to shoot and kill the soldiers who beat Elise. They then die side by side as they declare their love for one another. When he wakes up on the clinic, Shogo is hypnotized, and has a vision of an idyllic island he inhabits with a photographer named Naomi, after their plane crashes. After some time, a ship full of poachers approaches the island, but a conflict with the animals ensues and Naomi is killed by a stray bullet. Shogo and the animals perish after the believed-to-be-dormant volcano erupts.

Back in the real world, Shogo is accused of murdering a nymphomaniac patient and escapes the institute. While he is training alone, Hiromi's former fiancé appears and pushes Shogo down a cliff, and he apparently dies but is rescued by Hiromi. Unconscious, Shogo has a vision of a dystopic future in which humans are subjugated by the race of clones called Synthians. He is sent to assassinate the queen of the Synthians, Queen Sigma, who physically resembles Hiromi, but falls for her instead. Gradually the queen begins to love him too, but after several mishaps involving her clones, Shogo is killed by a clone of himself created by the general of the Synthians (who resembles Hiromi's fiancé).

Upon returning to the real world, he witness a double suicide by a couple whose love was not permitted by their families. When he discovers Hiromi is a physician who is trying to "cure" him, Shogo tries to commit suicide, but Hiromi stops him, falling over the edge. Shogo rescues Hiromi, and, as they acknowledge their love for one another, she dies in his arms. The police, along with the institute's doctor, find Shogo and attempt to inform him that the nymphomaniac's death was her own fault. However, Shogo tells the doctor that he finally knows what love is and that life has no meaning without Hiromi. Shogo dumps Hiromi's body in a canister of oil and provokes the police into shooting him, which kills him instantly. After this, Shogo is brought back before Aphrodite, who tells him that he must continue to endure pain and suffering whenever he finds love for the rest of eternity.

Production
Sex education for children was a taboo in Japan in the late 1960s, but this changed suddenly in the early 1970s. Apollo's Song was created during a period where manga was increasingly portraying sexual stories and imagery, and was Tezuka's exploration of love and sex in manga form. This period in Japan was also marked by violent student riots and incidents involving student activists, and Tezuka reportedly later said that Shogo's depressed character reflected the dark mood and instability in society at the time.

References

Further reading

External links
 Apollo's Song at TezukaOsamu.Net 
 Apollo's Song page at publisher Vertical, Inc.

1970 manga
Osamu Tezuka manga
Science fiction anime and manga
Shōnen Gahōsha manga
Shōnen manga
Comics about cloning
Vertical (publisher) titles
Gekiga
Gekiga by Osamu Tezuka